Opamyrma hungvuong is a species of ant found in central Vietnam, first described in 2008. It is the only species in the genus Opamyrma. While originally classified in the subfamily Amblyoponinae, it is presently considered to belong to the subfamily Leptanillinae.

References

External links

 Review of Opamyrma: Opamyrma

Amblyoponinae
Insects of Vietnam
Monotypic ant genera
Hymenoptera of Asia